The Nostrand Avenue station was a station on the demolished BMT Lexington Avenue Line in Brooklyn, New York City. It was opened on May 13, 1885, and had two tracks and two side platforms. It was located at the intersection of Lexington Avenue and Nostrand Avenue. It also had connections to the Nostrand Avenue Line and Lorimer Street Line streetcars. The station closed on October 13, 1950. The next southbound stop was Franklin Avenue. The next northbound stop was Tompkins Avenue. The current site of the station is mostly residential with the exception of storefronts along the first floors of brownstones on the southeast corner of the intersection.

References

BMT Lexington Avenue Line stations
Railway stations in the United States opened in 1885
Railway stations closed in 1950
Former elevated and subway stations in Brooklyn